Abgoosht ( Âbgušt, ; literally "meat broth") is an Iranian stew. It is also called Dizi, which refers to the traditional stoneware crocks it is served in. Some describe it as a "hearty mutton Persian soup thickened with chickpeas."

Preparation
Ābgoosht is usually made with lamb, chickpeas, white beans, onion, potatoes, tomatoes, turmeric, and dried lime. Other variations exist in the beans used, such as kidney beans and black-eyed peas. The ingredients are combined and cooked until done, at which point the dish is strained. The solids are  mashed as gusht kubideh (literally "mashed meat") and served with the broth, but in a separate dish, along with flatbread. The popular Azerbaijani dish piti is a variety of abgoosht and encompasses many similar dishes in the region.

Variations

Assyrian abgoosht
Assyrians of northwestern Iran, particularly surrounding Urmia, traditionally make abgoosht using beef, lime, kidney beans, and chickpeas, which is served in a lime broth with potatoes and eaten with onions and lavasha (an Assyrian bread) on the side. Assyrians typically make abgoosht in the winter. The regional pronunciation is "abgoosh", without the 't'.

Armenian abgoosht
A similar dish in Armenia is also called abgoosht. The difference is that in Armenia beef rather than lamb is used.

Piti (Caucasus and Central Asia)
Piti (or putuk) is a variation of abgoosht in the cuisines of the Caucasus and Central Asia.

See also
 Bozbash
 Armenian cuisine
 Assyrian cuisine
 Iranian cuisine
 Goulash
 List of lamb dishes
 Stock (food)

References

External links
 Abgoosht

Armenian cuisine
Assyrian cuisine
Chickpea dishes
Iranian stews
Iraqi cuisine
Lamb dishes
Soups